Middle of Nowhere is a 2012 independent feature film written and directed by Ava DuVernay and starring Emayatzy Corinealdi, David Oyelowo, Omari Hardwick and Lorraine Toussaint. The film was the winner of the Directing Award for U.S. Dramatic Film at the 2012 Sundance Film Festival.

Plot
Ruby is a registered nurse in Compton, California, who had been working to become a doctor and now dedicates most of her time to visiting her husband Derek in prison and helping him to get paroled early.  Flashbacks during the film depict Derek's arrest and, along with encounters with one of Derek's friends, Rashad, suggest that Ruby has not been aware of everything that Derek had been doing.  As pressures for Derek's case build, Ruby's life becomes increasingly constricted.  She ultimately distances herself from her sister Rosie, whose son she has often cared for, and from her mother Ruth, who is poisonously bitter that her daughters have not lived up to her expectations.

Ruby's one growing attachment is with Brian, a bus driver, who is clearly attracted to her.  While Ruby feels guilty as they begin to date, she eventually learns that Derek has lied to her more than once and begins to come to terms with how to forge ahead with her own life while remaining true to her convictions.

Cast
 Emayatzy Corinealdi as Ruby
 David Oyelowo as Brian
 Omari Hardwick as Derek
 Lorraine Toussaint as Ruth
 Edwina Findley as Rosie
 Sharon Lawrence as Fraine

Production

Development

DuVernay explained that when she began to examine what life is like in Compton and "the texture of the lives of women who live there", the subject of incarceration kept coming up. The director spent months conducting research for the film, including interviewing the wives of felons, before writing a screenplay. DuVernay revealed that she was exploring the same theme of "lost love and how it affects you when it's gone" in Middle of Nowhere as she did in her first feature, I Will Follow (2010). The director considered herself fortunate to be able to explore personal themes of interest in her second film.

Describing her viewpoint, DuVernay told Allison Samuels of The Daily Beast, 
"This is a story I know very well. I'm from Los Angeles and I know countless women who live this kind of life every day, year after year. You see women struggling to keep it all together while a loved one is in jail. But we don't hear about them or their struggles in a way that resonates with others. Their stories are so compelling. It's as if they are in their own little world and no one else sees them. I also wanted to talk about the love between two people in a setting that isn't the norm and how they survive."

Filming
Middle of Nowhere had a budget of $200,000 and was shot in June 2011 over nineteen days, half of the studio average of forty days. DuVernay told IndieWire's Claire Easton that it was difficult filming over a short period of time and thought that she could have used a couple more days. She continued "It really would just allow us to have more takes, and explore things more. But ultimately, you know, my first film was shot in 15 days, so I gained 4 days. So, one day maybe I'll get out of the teens!"

DuVernay and her crew spent a week filming in a South Los Angeles neighborhood. A "well-maintained Spanish mission-style duplex" on East 91st Street doubled as Ruby's house in the film. DuVernay said "When people think South-Central or Compton, it's all Boyz n the Hood. It's never a house like this. It becomes an assumption that people who live in these communities don't care about their home, don't work as hard for them and don't own their homes. That's one of the reasons why I chose this area. It reminded me of the house I grew up in." Other shooting locations included Inglewood, a federal correction facility in Victorville, Leimert Park, and East Los Angeles. DuVernay wanted to film the movie in places that were authentic to her characters. She also made sure that the locations were used in such a way that they would not detract from the story.

Release
Middle of Nowhere had its world premiere at the Sundance Film Festival held in January 2012. The film opened in the United States on October 12, 2012.

Reception

Box office
Melissa Silverstein from IndieWire reported that Middle of Nowhere had the top per screen average during its opening weekend. The film opened in six theaters, making $67,909. The following week, it expanded to a further sixteen screens and earned $50,554. As of January 12, 2013, Middle of Nowhere has grossed $236,806.

Critical response
, the film holds an 83% approval rating on film review aggregation site Rotten Tomatoes, based on 50 reviews with an average rating of 7.78/10. Metacritic, which assigns a score of 1–100 to individual film reviews, gave Middle of Nowhere an average rating of 75 based on 19 reviews.

Roger Ebert gave the film three stars and praised Corinealdi's performance, calling it "star-making". Kenneth Turan from the Los Angeles Times stated "Though Middle of Nowhere is very much a character piece, it benefits from some intricate plotting, and going where you think it will go is not on this film's mind. When you question everything about yourself, Ruby has to ask, what do you have to hold onto? We don't often have films that ask questions like these or ones that answer them as effectively." Middle of Nowhere was named one of The New York Times Critics' Pick and Manohla Dargis commented, "A plaintive, slow-boiling, quietly soul-stirring drama about a woman coming into her own, Middle of Nowhere carries the imprimatur of Sundance, but without the dreary stereotypes or self-satisfied politics that can (at times unfairly) characterize its offerings."

Accolades

References

External links
 
 
 
 
 
 

2012 films
American independent films
American drama films
Sundance Film Festival award winners
Participant (company) films
Films directed by Ava DuVernay
2010s English-language films
2012 independent films
2010s American films
John Cassavetes Award winners